The 1968–69 Bundesliga was the sixth season of the Bundesliga, West Germany's premier football league. It began on 17 August 1968 and ended on 7 June 1969. 1. FC Nürnberg were the defending champions.

Competition modus
Every team played two games against each other team, one at home and one away. Teams received two points for a win and one point for a draw. If two or more teams were tied on points, places were determined by goal average. The team with the most points were crowned champions while the two teams with the fewest points were relegated to their respective Regionalliga divisions.

Team changes to 1967–68
Borussia Neunkirchen and Karlsruher SC were relegated to the Regionalliga after finishing in the last two places. They were replaced by Hertha BSC Berlin and Kickers Offenbach, who won their respective promotion play-off groups.

Season overview
The dominant team of the 1968–69 season was FC Bayern Munich. Bayern were in first place of the standings from the very first matchday and never looked back, continuously increasing their margin to eventually eight points, the biggest so far in league history. They were victorious in the DFB Cup as well, beating Schalke in the final by a 2–1 score. Keys to their double win were their improved defense and top scorer Gerd Müller, who scored 30 goals.

Behind Bayern, the league continued to create surprises. Alemannia Aachen ended up in second place after a campaign which featured almost every position between second and 16th. Other notable astonishments were Eintracht Braunschweig, who finished in fourth place, and 1. FC Köln, who ended their season in a dismal 13th position.

Köln even were in danger of being relegated prior to the last matchday, sitting in 15th place with 30 points at that time. They played 1. FC Nürnberg at home, who also were in relegation trouble as 16th-placed team, one point behind Köln. Another match on that day was the clash between 17th-placed Borussia Dortmund and 18th-placed Kickers Offenbach. Both teams had 28 points prior to the game. After the matches were over, both Nürnberg and Offenbach had received 3–0 defeats, resulting in the demotion of both teams.

The demotion of Nürnberg was especially tragic as they had been Bundesliga champions only 12 months ago. Nevertheless, a pre-season sell-out of their best players and continuous quarrels between coach Max Merkel and his players proved to be costly, and although Merkel was sacked in late March 1969, it was too late to reverse tides. A home draw to Dortmund on matchday 33 and the defeat against Köln one week later eventually sealed their fate.

Team overview

League table

Results

Top goalscorers
30 goals
  Gerd Müller (FC Bayern Munich)

23 goals
  Uwe Seeler (Hamburger SV)

17 goals
  Josip Skoblar (Hannover 96)

15 goals
  Werner Görts (SV Werder Bremen)
  Herbert Laumen (Borussia Mönchengladbach)
  Hartmut Weiß (Eintracht Braunschweig)

14 goals
  Carl-Heinz Rühl (1. FC Köln)

13 goals
  Bernd Rupp (SV Werder Bremen)

12 goals
  Lothar Emmerich (Borussia Dortmund)
  Heinz-Dieter Hasebrink (1. FC Kaiserslautern)
  Heinz-Gerd Klostermann (Alemannia Aachen)

Champion squad

See also
 1968–69 DFB-Pokal

References

External links
 DFB Bundesliga archive 1968/1969

Bundesliga seasons
1
Germany